Ioan Totu (May 14, 1931 – April 21, 1992) was a Romanian communist politician who served as the Vice Prime Minister of Romania from 1982 to 1985 and as Minister of Foreign Affairs from 1986 to 1989, during the rule of Nicolae Ceaușescu. He briefly served as President of the State Planning Committee in late 1989.

Life and political career
Totu was an economist and member of the Romanian Politburo. He also served as the head of the Romanian mission to East European Common Market (CEMA). He was generally known for his toughness, especially in his comments to the US Department of State regarding the latter's criticism of the Romanian government for human rights abuse. As a member of Nicolae Ceaușescu's regime, he harshly criticized the U.S. Secretary of State George P. Shultz for seeking to "weaken the positions of socialism".

Totu was appointed Vice Prime Minister of Romania on November 3, 1982 and served in this post until March 28, 1985. On August 26, 1986 he was appointed Minister of Foreign Affairs of Romania replacing a less experienced diplomat Ilie Văduva. As Minister of Foreign Affairs, Totu re-established Romania's relations with Israel with the purpose to expand trade and economic relations, and to play an international role in the Middle East peace process. His term in office ended on November 2, 1989 and he was appointed the President of the State Planning Committee on November 4 which he held until December 22, 1989.

In the Great National Assembly, Totu represented Dragalina, Călărași County from 1980 to 1985, and Dumbrăveni, Sibiu County from 1985 to 1989.

Imprisonment and death
Totu was arrested during the Romanian Revolution of 1989. He was tried along with 24 Romanian Politburo members by the Military Court of Romania and sentenced to five and a half years in a Bucharest prison. After conviction and imprisonment, Totu committed suicide by hanging in 1992.

See also
Romanian Communist Party
Nicolae Ceaușescu
Foreign relations of Romania

References

1931 births
1992 deaths
Politicians from Bucharest
Romanian communists
Romanian Ministers of Foreign Affairs
Members of the Great National Assembly